Jacco Eltingh and Paul Haarhuis were the defending champions. Eltingh chose not to participate. Haarhuis teamed up with Jared Palmer, but they lost in the first round to Andrea Gaudenzi and Diego Nargiso. 

Olivier Delaître and Tim Henman won the title, by defeating Jiří Novák and David Rikl 6–2, 6–3 in the final.

Seeds
Champion seeds are indicated in bold text while text in italics indicates the round in which those seeds were eliminated.

Draw

Finals

Top half

Bottom half

References

Monte Carlo Masters

1999 in Monégasque sport